Guillermo Martínez (born 29 July 1962) is an Argentine novelist and short story writer.

Martínez was born in Bahía Blanca, Argentina. He gained a PhD in mathematical logic at the University of Buenos Aires.

After his degree in Argentina, he worked for two years in a postdoctoral position at the Mathematical Institute, Oxford. His most successful novel has been Crímenes Imperceptibles (Imperceptible Crimes), known in English as The Oxford Murders, written in 2003. In the same year, he was awarded the Planeta Prize for this novel, which has been translated into a number of languages. The book has appeared as a film in 2008, directed by Alex de la Iglesia, and starring John Hurt, Elijah Wood, Leonor Watling and Julie Cox.

Books
 Vast Hell (Infierno grande, 1989) — short stories
 Regarding Roderer (Acerca de Roderer, 1993) — novel
 The Woman of the Master (La mujer del maestro, 1998) — novel
 Borges and Mathematics (Borges y las matemáticas, 2003) — essays
 The Oxford Murders (Crímenes imperceptibles, 2003) — novel
 The Immortality Formula (La fórmula de la inmortalidad, 2005) — essays
 The Book of Murder (La Muerte Lenta de Luciana B, 2007) — novel
 Gödel (para todos), 2009 — essay
 Lalu la luco, 2016 — novel
 The Oxford Brotherhood (Little, Brown, 2021) — novel

References

External links
 Guillermo Martínez website 
 Fantastic Fiction entry

1962 births
Living people
People from Bahía Blanca
University of Buenos Aires alumni
International Writing Program alumni
Argentine male novelists

Argentine mathematicians
Academics of the University of Oxford
20th-century Argentine novelists
21st-century Argentine novelists
20th-century Argentine male writers
21st-century Argentine male writers